The 1998 UNLV Rebels football team was an American football team that represented the University of Nevada, Las Vegas in the Western Athletic Conference during the 1998 NCAA Division I-A football season. In their fifth year under head coach Jeff Horton, the team compiled an 0–11 record.

Schedule

References

UNLV
UNLV Rebels football seasons
College football winless seasons
UNLV Rebels football